The Mount Inayawan Range Natural Park (also Mount Iniaoan Range Natural Park) is a protected area of forested mountains in the Northern Mindanao region of the Philippines. The area was officially designated as a natural park on 30 July 2007 through Proclamation No. 1344 signed by President Gloria Arroyo. It is a critical watershed area and the largest remaining rainforest in Lanao del Norte.

Description
It consists of three other lakes which supply water for the municipalities in the Kapatagan Valley and holds an abundant supply of fish.

Wildlife
The Mount Inayawan Range Natural Park is home to a diverse fauna. They include endangered and rare species such as the Philippine eagle, Philippine deer, Mindanao flying squirrel, Mindanao scops owl, white-collared kingfisher, Philippine warty pig and Mindanao hornbill.

References

Natural parks of the Philippines
Geography of Lanao del Norte
Protected areas established in 2007
2007 establishments in the Philippines